Rhynchactis leptonema is a species of whipnose angler found in tropical and sub-tropical oceans where it is found at depths of around .  This species grows to a length of  TL.

References
 

Lophiiformes
Taxa named by Charles Tate Regan
Fish described in 1925